Cibeles Romero Misioner (born 22 June 1978 in Madrid) is a former female field hockey player from Spain, who was a member of the Women's National Team at the 2000 Summer Olympics in Sydney, Australia. There the team ended up in fourth place under the guidance of Dutch coach Marc Lammers. She played club hockey for SPV 51 in Madrid.

References

External links
 

1978 births
Living people
Spanish female field hockey players
Female field hockey goalkeepers
Olympic field hockey players of Spain
Field hockey players at the 2000 Summer Olympics
Field hockey players from Madrid